Lancret is a surname. Notable people with the surname include:

Michel Ange Lancret (1774–1807), French engineer
Nicolas Lancret (1690–1743), French painter
Bernard Lancret (1912–1983), French film actor

See also
Lancet (disambiguation)

Surnames of French origin